The Queen Elizabeth-class battleships were a group of five super-dreadnoughts built for the Royal Navy during the 1910s. The corresponding  ships were generally considered competitive, although the Queen Elizabeth class were  faster and outnumbered the German class 5:2. The Queen Elizabeths are generally considered the first fast battleships of their day.

The Queen Elizabeths were the first battleships to be armed with  guns, and were described in the 1919 edition of Jane's Fighting Ships as "the most successful type of capital ship yet designed." They saw much service in both world wars. Barham was lost to U-boat attack in 1941, but the others survived the wars and were scrapped in the late 1940s.

Background and design

The early design history of the Queen Elizabeth class is not well known because not many records have survived in the files of the Admiralty. When Winston Churchill became First Lord of the Admiralty in October 1911, the ships of the 1911–1912 Naval Programme, the four s and the battlecruiser  were being ordered and preliminary design work had begun on the new class of battleships scheduled for the 1912–1913 Naval Programme. Each class received its own alphabetical designation with the Iron Dukes being MIV, the fourth major iteration of Design M. Presumably the improved 1912–1913 ships were Design N, but no details of it have been found in Admiralty records. The letter O was not used during this time. Naval historian Norman Friedman believes that Design P was a slow ship armed with ten  guns based on a passing reference in the official history of naval construction during the First World War that such a ship was a precursor to the Queen Elizabeths.

Churchill and the retired First Sea Lord, Admiral of the Fleet Lord Fisher corresponded at length during this time with Fisher advocating for a fast (probably ) ship armed with eight guns and nearly as well armoured as a battleship, something that he sometimes called a "super-Lion", referring to the battlecruiser . Friedman believes that the Director of Naval Construction (DNC), Sir Philip Watts, designated Fisher's concept as Design Q with a slower version being the Queen Elizabeth class as Design R. "The destruction of papers may thus have concealed the reality that instead of being a spectacular advance on previous battleships, the Queen Elizabeths were a slow version of a ship which Fisher and probably Churchill badly wanted. Much of the fragmentary evidence for the fast ship is to be found in Fisher's letters to Churchill."

The tactical mission of these ships is portrayed as being fast enough to manoeuvre to catch the head of the enemy's battleline and concentrate fire against it, but they were actually intended to prevent the German battlecruisers, which were more heavily armoured than their British equivalents, from doing the same to the British fleet. A memo from Churchill to Rear-Admiral Gordon Moore, Third Sea Lord, on 27 October 1912, stated "the speed and power of the Queen Elizabeths...is sufficient to protect the battle fleet against any turning movement by German battlecruisers.

Influenced by Fisher, Churchill ordered development of the 42-calibre BL 15-inch Mk I gun using the codename "14inch Experimental" in January 1912. This was a risky decision as development of new heavy guns and their turrets was normally a multi-year project, and a failure would seriously delay the completion of the ships. The first gun turret was successfully tested on 6 May 1914, likely much to the relief of the Admiralty.

The Admiralty decided on the design of the Queen Elizabeths on 15 June 1912, with the decision on whether they would solely use fuel oil deferred to a subsequent meeting. That meeting must have happened very shortly afterwards because the design that received the Board's stamp the following day was oil-fueled. The design had not been optimised to burn oil instead of coal and the fuel tanks had different requirements than the coal bunkers previously planned. Eustace Tennyson d'Eyncourt, the DNC who followed Watts, estimated that the change so late in the design process cost some  that could have been put to better use. To guarantee a supply of oil in wartime, Churchill negotiated the Anglo-Persian Oil Convention.

Fisher also believed that the 1912–1913 ships should all be battlecruisers instead of the usual mix of three battleships and a battlecruiser. Churchill initially agreed with him, but was persuaded to go back to the original plan, much to Fisher's fury. When the Federation of Malay States offered to fund a further capital ship, the Admiralty decided to add a fifth unit to the class, .

In some respects, the ships did not quite fulfil their extremely demanding requirement. They were seriously overweight, as a result of which the draught was excessive and they were unable to reach the planned top speed of 25 knots.

Description
Their crew numbered between 923 and 951 officers and ratings as completed; by 1920, the number of crew had grown to 1,016 then to 1,025. Service as a flagship increased these numbers from 1,249 to 1,262 that same year.

The latter pair were not equipped with the cruising turbines to improve fuel economy at slow speeds used in the first three ships. The boilers were ducted into a pair of funnels. The turbines were divided into three watertight compartments arranged side by side; the low-pressure turbines driving the inner pair of shafts were in the centre engine room together, while the high-pressure outboard turbines were in the rooms on either side.

Armament and fire control
The Queen Elizabeth class was equipped with eight breech-loading (BL) 15-inch Mk I guns in four twin-gun turrets, in two superfiring pairs fore and aft of the superstructure, designated 'A', 'B', 'X', and 'Y' from front to rear. The guns were initially supplied with 80 shells per gun, but the magazines were later modified to allow for up to one hundred shells per gun. The ships carried the guns in Mk I mounts that allowed for elevation to 20 degrees and depression to -5 degrees. The mounts had a weight of 782 t and a train of- 150 to + 150 degrees. The guns themselves had a weight of 101 t. They could be loaded at any angle, but the crews typically returned to +5 degrees, since the guns could be cleared faster that way. Their designed rate of fire was one shot every 36 seconds.

The gun even remained competitive in the Second World War after receiving further shell upgrades and mountings with greater elevation, and HMS Warspite would eventually record a hit during the Battle of Calabria which to this day is one of the longest-range naval gunnery hits in history - 24,000 metres (26,000 yd).

The guns could elevate to 20° and depress to −5°, but the turret sights could only elevate 15°, effectively limiting the range that could be achieved unless firing under director control.  The sights were equipped to permit the guns to fire at full charge or with  charge.

The ships' secondary battery consisted of sixteen 45-calibre BL  Mk XII guns. As designed twelve of these were mounted in casemates on the upper deck, six of each on the broadside of the vessel amidships; the remaining four guns were on the main deck aft abreast 'Y' turret. In an effort to ameliorate the flooding problems that the casemated guns in the Iron Duke-class ships had in heavy seas, the guns in the Queen Elizabeths were moved back from abreast 'A' turret to 'B' turret, but this made little difference in service. The aft guns were more prone to flood and were virtually useless even in moderate seas. Only Queen Elizabeth was completed with them; one pair was removed and the other was repositioned on the forecastle and protected by gun shields in May 1915. The casemates were plated over to improve their seaworthiness. The other ships were similarly modified while fitting-out.

Each gun was provided with 130 rounds. Stowage was provided for 30 rounds at each gun as the only ammunition hoists for them were located at the forward end of the battery. Captain Morgan Singer, commander of the RN's gunnery school HMS Excellent, criticized this arrangement, saying that it had been proven inefficient in the pre-dreadnought battleships and he recommended using dredger hoists as they were much faster. His comments were rejected as the Admiralty believed that the guns would only intermittently be in use as destroyers attempted to close to torpedo range and they desired to maintain a break in the cordite supply between the magazines and the battery. In service this led to the gun crews keeping additional rounds immediately available at the guns in case they were needed. This resulted in an ammunition fire aboard Malaya during the Battle of Jutland that nearly resulted in the loss of the ship.

The ships also mounted four 3-pounder saluting guns. Their anti-aircraft (AA) armament consisted of two quick-firing (QF)  20 cwt Mk I guns. They were fitted with four submerged  torpedo tubes, two on each broadside. Each ship was supplied with a total of 20 Mk II or Mk IV torpedoes.

The Queen Elizabeth-class ships were completed with two fire-control directors. The one that was mounted above the conning tower was protected by an armoured hood and was fitted with a  rangefinder. The main armament could be controlled by 'X' turret as well and each turret was fitted with a 15-foot rangefinder. A torpedo-control director with a 9-foot rangefinder was mounted at the aft end of the superstructure. The secondary armament was primarily controlled by directors mounted on each side of the compass platform on the foremast once they began to be fitted in March 1917. The rangefinders in 'B' and 'X' turrets were replaced by  models between 1919 and 1922.

Flying-off platforms were fitted on all the ships on the roofs of 'B' and 'X' turrets in 1918. Between them the ships carried three fighters and seven reconnaissance aircraft.

Armour
Armour protection was modified from the previous , with a thicker belt and improved underwater protection. The scale of deck armour was less generous, though typical of contemporary practice.

Ships
A further ship was authorised in 1914 and would have been named Agincourt (a name later applied to a dreadnought expropriated from Ottoman Turkey). Although most sources and several official papers in the class's Ships Cover describe her as a further repeat of the Queen Elizabeth design, one historian has suggested that Agincourt would have been built on battlecruiser lines. Whatever the case, Agincourt was cancelled at the outbreak of war in 1914.

Service

First World War
In the First World War, Queen Elizabeth was detached from the squadron and took part in the Dardanelles Campaign, but missed Jutland as she was undergoing dock maintenance.

These battleships were able to engage German battlecruisers at a range of 19,000 yards (17,400 m), which was beyond the maximum range of the Germans' guns. Three of the Queen Elizabeths received hits from German warships during the engagement, yet they all returned home. Warspite was the most heavily damaged, with her rudder jammed and taking fifteen hits, coming close to foundering.

Between the wars
Between the wars, the ships received considerable upgrades, including new machinery, small-tube boilers, deck armour upgrades, torpedo belt armour, trunked funnels, new secondary armament and anti-aircraft armament, and many improvements in gunlaying and electronics. Queen Elizabeth, Valiant, and Warspite were the most modernised, with all three receiving the new "Queen Anne's Mansions" block superstructure for the bridge, whilst twenty 4.5" dual-purpose guns in 10 turret mountings replaced the 6" casemate secondary weapons on Queen Elizabeth and Valiant. Warspite kept her 6" secondary guns, now reduced to just four per battery.

Second World War

By the Second World War, the class were showing their age. Barham and Malaya, the least-modernized of the class, were at a disadvantage compared to modern battleships. Queen Elizabeth, Warspite, and Valiant, the more modernised of the class, fared better. With her modern fire control equipment, Warspite scored a hit on an Italian battleship during the Battle of Calabria at a range of more than 26,000 yards, one of the longest range naval artillery hits in history.

Modern torpedoes outclassed their torpedo belt protection: in November 1941, Barham was torpedoed by a U-boat and sank in five minutes, with the loss of over 800 of her crew, when her magazines detonated. Warspite survived a direct hit and two near-misses by German glider bombs, while Queen Elizabeth and Valiant were repaired and returned to service after being badly damaged by limpet mines placed by Italian frogmen during a raid at Alexandria Harbour in 1941.

HMS Queen Elizabeth
 took part in the Dardanelles Campaign of 1915 bombarding forts, but missed Jutland in 1916. She became Admiral Beatty's flagship in 1917 after he assumed command of the Grand Fleet. In the Second World War she was mined by Italian frogmen and badly damaged, but did not ground in the shallow water of Alexandria Harbour in 1941. She was subsequently repaired, and served in the Far East until 1945.

HMS Warspite
 suffered severe damage at Jutland, being hit by at least 15 heavy shells. She lost 14 men, with 32 wounded, firing a total of 259 shells. In the Second World War, she took part in many battles, including Narvik, Cape Matapan, Crete, and Salerno, where she was hit by a glider bomb. She was never fully repaired, and became a coastal bombardment ship, covering the Normandy landings, further operations in other parts of France, and the Walcheren landings. She holds the most battle honours for an individual ship in the Royal Navy's history, with 15.

HMS Valiant
 received no hits at Jutland but suffered one wounded and fired 288 shells. In the Second World War, she took part in the attack on the French Fleet at Mers-el-Kebir, and was mined and damaged at Alexandria in 1941. She was repaired, and served in the Far East until 1944. On 8 August 1944 whilst in the floating dock at Trincomalee, Ceylon, she was severely damaged when the dock collapsed with the result that repairs were stopped.

HMS Barham
 was named after Lord Barham, First Lord of the Admiralty. The Barham received five hits at Jutland, suffering 26 dead and 46 wounded and fired 337 shells. In the Second World War, she fought at Cape Matapan.

HMS Malaya
 was hit eight times at Jutland, suffering 63 dead and 68 wounded, and fired 215 shells. Subsequently, she escorted several convoys and supported various operations following the Normandy invasion until she was decommissioned in 1945.

HMS Agincourt
HMS Agincourt was to be the sixth member of the Queen Elizabeth class. She was authorized in 1913, and intended for completion in late 1916, but was cancelled after the outbreak of the First World War. She is not to be confused with  that was ordered by Brazil, sold to the Ottoman Empire while under construction, and seized for use by the Royal Navy before the beginning of the first World War.

Other ships
The Canadian Naval Aid Bill of 1913 intended to provide the funds for three modern battleships, which most likely would have been three more members of the Queen Elizabeth class, potentially named as Acadia, Quebec and Ontario, in much the same way as Malaya had been funded. The bill met with stiff opposition in Parliament, and was not passed.

Notes

Citations

Bibliography

External links

 Troels Hansen, Queen Elizabeth class and Battle of Jutland
 Dreadnought Project Technical material on the weaponry and fire control for the ships

Battleship classes
 Queen Elizabeth class battleship
Ship classes of the Royal Navy
 Queen Elizabeth class battleship
 Queen Elizabeth class battleship